Re Lehman Brothers International (Europe) [2012] UKSC 6 is an English trusts law and UK insolvency law case, concerning the certainty of subject matter to create a trust.

Facts
Lehman Brothers International (Europe) was the UK subsidiary of Lehman Brothers Holdings Inc, the US parent that had gone in Chapter 11 bankruptcy proceedings. It had held money on behalf of many clients, including some affiliates of Lehman. The client money rules of Financial Services Authority were in the Client Assets Sourcebook, chapter 7, issued under the FSMA 2000 section 138. FSMA 2000 section 139 permitted FSA rulemaking for ‘clients’ money being held on trust in accordance with the rules’, and accordingly CASS 7.7.2R said that client money was to be held on trust for the purpose of the client money rules. If a firm failed, the client money distribution rules in CASS 7.9 applied. But under CASS 7.4, a firm could either (1) pay money into a segregated account or (2) put the money into the firm's own house accounts and then segregate it into client accounts at the close of the preceding day's business. Lehman had done the alternative approach in (2). On 15 September 2008, Lehman went into administration, a ‘primary pooling event’ under CASS 7, so the funds in each ‘client money account’ were to be treated as pooled and then distributed so that each client received a sum rateable to their ‘client money entitlement’. The administrators asked the High Court for directions under the Insolvency Act 1986 Schedule B1, about how to apply CASS 7 to the client money that Lehman held. There was a lot of unsegregated client money in the firm's house accounts because of the operation of the alternative approach, and also significant non-compliance of Lehman with CASS 7 over a long time.

Judgment

High Court
Briggs J held the statutory trust imposed on the client's funds under CASS 7 arose as soon as a firm received them. This was to achieve better protection as required by the Markets in Financial Instruments Directive 2004/39/EC, article 13(7) and the Implementing Directive 2006/73/EC art 16. The term ‘client money account’, for what money needed to be pooled under CASS 7.9.6R referred to segregated accounts of a client, not any other account of the firm, so it excluded identifiable client money in house accounts. The pool was to be distributed only among clients whose funds had been placed in segregated accounts.

Court of Appeal
Lord Neuberger MR, Arden LJ and Sir Mark Waller dismissed Lehman Brothers Holding Inc's appeal on the timing of the statutory trust, but allowed the appeal of a representative of Lehman's non-segregated clients and two affiliates. It held the pool comprised all identifiable client money the firm's hands, and all were entitled to participate in the pool. A representative of the secured clients appealed.

Arden LJ said the following.

Lord Neuberger MR concurred, saying the following.

Supreme Court
Lord Clarke, Lord Dyson and Lord Collins held that, dismissing the appeal, CASS 7 was to be construed according to the purpose of the MiFiD 2004/39/EC and 2006/73/EC, to achieve a high level of protection for client money, with the prompt and scrupulous segregation of funds. The statutory trust created by CASS 7.7.2R arose on receipt of the client money, and the fiduciary duties imposed by CASS 7 were owed by LBIE in respect of all client money, not just balances standing to credit in client accounts. The decision that fiduciary duties were owed by a firm in respect of all client money was relevant to construe CASS 7. If there was a choice of interpretations, then the one chosen should be the highest level of protection. Although CASS 7 used trust concepts, it was not meant to limit trust law. CASS 7.9.6R(2) referred to a client's contractual entitlement when it said ‘client money entitlement’ to have money segregated. Lord Clarke said the following.

Lord Dyson gave the leading judgment.

Lord Collins gave a concurring judgment.

Lord Hope gave the initial opinion, but dissented, saying the following.

Lord Walker dissented.

See also

English trust law

Notes

References

English trusts case law
Supreme Court of the United Kingdom cases
2012 in British law
2012 in case law
Lehman Brothers